The John Morrow Elementary School (also known as Morrow Elementary School and Pittsburgh Morrow PreK-5) located at 1611 Davis Avenue in the Brighton Heights neighborhood of Pittsburgh, Pennsylvania, was built in 1895 (with additions in 1922 and later).  It was added to the National Register of Historic Places on September 30, 1986, and the List of Pittsburgh History and Landmarks Foundation Historic Landmarks in 2002.

References

School buildings on the National Register of Historic Places in Pennsylvania
Schools in Pittsburgh
School buildings completed in 1895
Renaissance Revival architecture in Pennsylvania
Pittsburgh History & Landmarks Foundation Historic Landmarks
National Register of Historic Places in Pittsburgh